The 2010 FIU Panthers football team represented Florida International University during the 2010 NCAA Division I FBS football season. The team was coached by Mario Cristobal and played their homes games at the on-campus FIU Stadium in Miami.

On November 27, 2010, the FIU Panthers won a share of their first ever Sun Belt Conference championship and became eligible to compete in a post-season bowl game for the first time in school history. The Panthers had the opportunity to win the Sun Belt Conference outright but faltered against the Middle Tennessee State Blue Raiders in the final game of regular season, 27–28. At the end of the regular season, FIU accepted an invitation to play in the Little Caesars Pizza Bowl on December 26, 2010, where they faced Toledo of the Mid-American Conference. FIU defeated Toledo 34–32, and clinched the school's first ever bowl game victory on the final play of the game with a 34-yard field goal by kicker Jack Griffin. FIU finished the 2010 season with a record of 7–6 (6–2 Sun Belt) and first winning season in school history.

The Rutgers University home opener game on September 11, 2010 broke attendance records at FIU Stadium for the season, with a record crowd of 19,872.

Schedule

Awards and honors

Post-season awards and honors
Sun Belt Conference Player of the Year: T. Y. Hilton (WR, Jr.)
Sun Belt Conference Coach of the Year: Mario Cristobal

All-Sun Belt honors
First Team All-Sun Belt Conference:
T. Y. Hilton (WR & Return Specialist, Jr.)
Brad Serini (OL, Sr.)
Jarvis Wilson (DL, Sr.)
Toronto Smith (LB, Sr.)
Anthony Gaitor (DB, Sr.)
Second Team All-Sun Belt Conference:
Darriet Perry (RB, Jr.)
Tourek Williams (DL, So.)
Johnathan Cyprien (DB, So.)
T. Y. Hilton (All-Purpose, Jr.)
Honorable Mention All-Sun Belt Conference:
Greg Ellingson (WR, Sr.)
Winston Fraser (LB, R-So.)

NFL Draft
7th Round, 222nd Overall Pick by the Tampa Bay Buccaneers—Sr. CB Anthony Gaitor

References

FIU
FIU Panthers football seasons
Sun Belt Conference football champion seasons
Little Caesars Pizza Bowl champion seasons
FIU Golden Panthers football